This is a list of British television related events from 1971.

Events

January
3 January – BBC Open University broadcasts begin on BBC2.
27 January – Valerie Barlow is electrocuted by a faulty hairdryer and then perishes in a house fire on Coronation Street.

February
3 February – After nearly three months, the ITV Colour Strike ends and programmes resume being made in colour.
6 February–13 March – BBC Two first broadcasts the serial Jude the Obscure, starring Robert Powell, in six 45-minute episodes.
17 February – BBC2 airs Elizabeth R, a drama serial of six 85-minute plays starring Glenda Jackson in the title role.
25 February – The animated children's adventure series Mr Benn airs on BBC1.

March
29 March – The US children's educational series Sesame Street begins airing on British television for the first time ever. It will debut on ITV by first airing on HTV.

April
10 April – The Two Ronnies makes its debut on BBC1.  Starring Ronnie Barker and Ronnie Corbett, it would go on to become one of the most successful and long-running light entertainment shows on British television, running until 1987.

May
22 May – Westward Television starts broadcasting in colour from the Redruth transmitter.

June
7 June – The UK children's magazine show Blue Peter buries a time capsule in the grounds of BBC Television Centre, due to be opened on the first episode of the year 2000.
16 June – BBC1 airs the documentary Yesterday's Men as part of the 24 Hours strand, a film about former Prime Minister Harold Wilson and the Labour Party Cabinet following Labour's loss of power at the 1970 general election. The BBC removes parts of the programme amid complaints from Labour about allegations surrounding Wilson's memoirs, prompting producer Angela Pope to have her name removed from the documentary. The BBC ultimately agrees not to repeat the film during Wilson's lifetime and it is not shown again until 2013.
19 June – The first episode of the late night chat show Parkinson with host Michael Parkinson is broadcast on BBC1.

July
No events.

August
 2 August – The Pendle Forest transmitter begins transmissions and becomes the first UHF relay service to be operated by the Independent Television Authority.

September
1 September – Border Television marks its tenth anniversary and begins broadcasting in colour, but initially only from the Caldbeck transmitter, while viewers served by the Selkirk transmitter had to wait until the following year for colour television broadcasts to begin.
 13 September – Westward begins broadcasting in colour from the Stockland Hill and Caradon Hill transmitters and to mark the change, Westward's ident is reshot in colour.
17 September – ITV debuts the action-comedy series The Persuaders! starring Roger Moore and Tony Curtis.
21 September – The Old Grey Whistle Test premieres on BBC2.
25 September – Sesame Street starts airing on LWT and Grampian Television.
30 September – Grampian Television marks its tenth anniversary and begins broadcasting in colour from the Durris transmitter.

October
2 October – Debut of The Generation Game on BBC1, presented by Bruce Forsyth.
9 October – ITV airs the UK version of the popular American game show Sale of the Century.
10 October – Upstairs, Downstairs debuts on ITV.

November
10 November – Princess Anne opens the BBC's new Pebble Mill studios in Birmingham.
20 November – The long-running children's programme Play Away debuts on BBC2 and is hosted by Brian Cant.

December
24 December – BBC1 airs M. R. James' The Stalls of Barchester, the first of several made-for-television short films, shown annually until 1978, known collectively as A Ghost Story for Christmas.

Debuts

BBC1
17 January – The Last of the Mohicans (1971)
21 January – Dave Allen at Large (1971–1979)
22 January – That's Your Funeral (1971)
13 February – The Mary Tyler Moore Show (1970–1977)
22 February –  Joe and the Gladiator (1971)
25 February – Mr Benn (1971, 2005)
26 February –  Sykes and a Big Big Show (1971)
15 March – Island of the Great Yellow Ox (1971)
1 April –  Now, Take My Wife (1971)
10 April – The Two Ronnies (1971–1987, 1991, 1996, 2005)
15 April –  It's Awfully Bad for Your Eyes, Darling (1971)
19 April – 
Alias Smith and Jones (1971–1973)
 Brett (1971)
14 May – Look, Mike Yarwood! (1971–1976)
18 June –  Ryan and Ronnie (1971–1973)
19 June – Parkinson (1971–1982, 1998–2007)
22 August –  The Silver Sword (1971)
15 September 
 Barlow at Large (1971–1975)
  Owen, M.D. (1971–1973)
20 September – A Taste of Honey (1971)
21 September – The Partridge Family (1970–1974)
2 October – The Generation Game (1971–1982, 1990–2002) 
4 October –  The Witch's Daughter (1971)
15 October – The Onedin Line (1971–1980)
21 October – Edna, the Inebriate Woman (1971)
23 October – Francis Durbridge Presents: The Passenger (1971)
5 November – Now Look Here (1971–1973)
8 November –  The Runaway Summer (1971)
14 November –  Tom Brown's Schooldays (1971)
24 December – A Ghost Story for Christmas (1971–1978)
28 December – The Snow Goose (1971)

BBC2
2 January –  Some Matters of Little Consequence (1971)
9 January –  Sense and Sensibility (1971)
27 January –  Long Voyage Out of War (1971)
6 February – Jude the Obscure (1971)
17 February – Elizabeth R (1971)
26 March – Sunset Song (1971)
8 May –  Bel Ami (1971)
11 June – Birds on the Wing  (1971)
7 July – Stage 2 (1971–1972)
7 August –  Cousin Bette (1971)
26 August –  Trial (1971)
12 September –  Eyeless in Gaza (1971)
21 September 
The Old Grey Whistle Test (1971–1987)
Look and Read: The Boy from Space (1971)
22 September – The Search for the Nile (1971)
14 November –  Wives and Daughters (1971)
16 November – Casanova (1971)
20 November – Play Away (1971–1984)
25 November –  The View from Daniel Pike (1971–1973)
25 December –  Cider with Rosie (1971)

ITV
8 January –  Six Dates with Barker (1971)
14 January – A Class by Himself (1971–1972)
30 January –  The More We Are Together (1971)
2 February – Bless This House (1971–1976)
19 February –  Coppers End (1971)
20 February –  The Leslie Crowther Show (1971)
28 February –  Doctor at Large (1971)
4 March –  Slapstick and Old Lace (1971)
29 March –  Sesame Street (1969–present)
30 March –  The Ten Commandments (1971)
7 April – Hine (1971)
9 April – Budgie (1971–1972)
18 April – Persuasion (1971)
27 April – ...And Mother Makes Three (1971–1973)
10 May –  The Last of the Baskets (1971–1972)
21 May – Kindly Leave the Kerb (1971)
6 June –  Jamie (1971)
12 June – The Comedians (1971–1985)
14 June –  Seasons of the Year (1971)
28 June – Follyfoot (1971–1973)
2 July –  The Trouble with Lilian (1971)
5 July –  You're Only Young Twice (1971)
10 July – The Guardians (1971)
11 July – The Odd Couple (1970–1975)
15 July – Alexander the Greatest (1971–1972)
4 August – The Edward Woodward Hour (1971–1972)
8 August – Justice (1971–1974)
1 September –  Frankie Howerd's Hour (1971)
15 September –  Jason King (1971–1972)
17 September – The Persuaders! (1971–1972)
20 September – The Rivals of Sherlock Holmes (1971–1973)
21 September –  Keep It in the Family (1971)
24 September – The Fenn Street Gang (1971–1973)
1 October –  The Marty Feldman Comedy Machine (1971)
9 October – Sale of the Century (1971–1983)
10 October – Upstairs, Downstairs (1971–1975, 2010–2012)
20 October –  Tottering Towers (1971–1972)
25 October – Lollipop Loves Mr Mole (1971–1972)
23 November –  Suspicion (1971–1972)
14 December –  Mike and Bernie (1971–1972)
Unknown – Grasshopper Island (1971)

Television shows

Returning this year after a break of one year or longer
Whack-O! (1956–1960; 1971–1972)

Continuing television shows

1920s
BBC Wimbledon (1927–1939, 1946–2019, 2021–2024)

1930s
The Boat Race (1938–1939, 1946–2019)
BBC Cricket (1939, 1946–1999, 2020–2024)

1940s
Come Dancing (1949–1998)

1950s
Watch with Mother (1952–1975) 
The Good Old Days (1953–1983)
Panorama (1953–present)
Dixon of Dock Green (1955–1976)
Crackerjack (1955–1984, 2020–present)
Opportunity Knocks (1956–1978, 1987–1990)
This Week (1956–1978, 1986–1992)
Armchair Theatre (1956–1974)
What the Papers Say (1956–2008)
The Sky at Night (1957–present)
Blue Peter (1958–present)
Grandstand (1958–2007)
The Black and White Minstrel Show (1958–1978)

1960s
Coronation Street (1960–present)
Songs of Praise (1961–present)
Steptoe and Son (1962–1965, 1970–1974)
Z-Cars (1962–1978)
Animal Magic (1962–1983)
Doctor Who (1963–1989, 1996, 2005–present)
World in Action (1963–1998)
Top of the Pops (1964–2006)
Match of the Day (1964–present)
Crossroads (1964–1988, 2001–2003)
Play School (1964–1988)
Mr. and Mrs. (1965–1999)
Call My Bluff (1965–2005)
World of Sport (1965–1985)
Jackanory (1965–1996, 2006)
Sportsnight (1965–1997)
It's a Knockout (1966–1982, 1999–2001)
The Money Programme (1966–2010)
Callan (1967–1972)
The Golden Shot (1967–1975)
ITV Playhouse (1967–1982)
Please Sir! (1968–1972)
Father, Dear Father (1968–1973)
Dad's Army (1968–1977)
Magpie (1968–1980)
The Big Match (1968–2002)
On the Buses (1969–1973)
Clangers (1969–1974, 2015–present)
Monty Python's Flying Circus (1969–1974)
Nationwide (1969–1983)
Screen Test (1969–1984)

1970s
A Family at War (1970–1972)
Queenie's Castle (1970–1972)
The Goodies (1970–1982)

Ending this year
 All Gas and Gaiters (1966–1971)
 Never Mind the Quality, Feel the Width (1967–1971)
 Me Mammy (1968–1971)
 The Mind of Mr. J.G. Reeder (1969–1971)
 Albert and Victoria (1970–1971)
 Bachelor Father (1970–1971)
 The Lovers (1970–1971)
 Timeslip (1970–1971)
 UFO (1970–1971)

Births
 1 January – Suzanne Virdee, British regional newscaster (Midlands Today)
 3 January – Sarah Alexander, actress
 5 January 
Joanna Gosling, journalist and newsreader
Jayne Middlemiss, British television presenter
 12 January – Jay Burridge, British artist and television presenter
 13 January – Sarah Tansey, UK actress (Heartbeat)
 15 January – Lara Cazalet, British actress
 16 January – Julia Ford, English actress
 20 January 
Pixie McKenna, Irish presenter (Embarrassing Bodies)
Gary Barlow, singer and actor
 29 January – Clare Balding, sports presenter, journalist and jockey
 30 January – Darren Boyd, actor
 31 January – Patrick Kielty, Northern Irish comedian and television presenter
 2 February – Michelle Gayle, singer and actress
 13 February – Sonia, English pop singer
 16 February 
Amanda Holden, British actress and television presenter
Steven Houghton, British actor and singer
 17 February – Jeremy Edwards, actor
 20 February – Sarah Hadland, actress
 23 February – Melinda Messenger, British television presenter and model
 2 March – Dave Gorman, comedian and broadcaster
 3 March – Charlie Brooker, presenter and satirist
 9 March – Stephanie Chambers, actress
 23 March – Gail Porter, British television presenter.
 5 April – Victoria Hamilton, actress
 15 April – Kate Harbour, voice actress
 16 April – Max Beesley, actor and musician
 17 April – Claire Sweeney, actress, singer and television personality
 18 April – David Tennant, Scottish actor
 27 May – Paul Bettany, British actor
 5 June – Susan Lynch, Northern Irish actress
 26 June – Emma Noble, actress and model
 5 July – Nicola Stephenson, actress
 24 July – John Partridge, actor
 25 July – Chloë Annett, actress
 20 August – Helen Grace, actress
 31 August – Kirstie Allsopp, British television presenter
 1 September – Debbie Chazen, actress
 7 September – Lisa Rogers, television presenter
 8 September – Martin Freeman, actor
 25 September – Jessie Wallace, British actress
 29 September – Mackenzie Crook, English actor
 4 October – Simone Hyams, actress
 13 October – Sacha Baron Cohen, British comedian
 16 October – Craig Phillips, British reality show star, Winner of Big Brother UK in 2000
 24 October – Dervla Kirwan, actress
 1 December – Emily Mortimer, British actress
 Unknown – Helen Blakeman, playwright and screenwriter

See also
 1971 in British music
 1971 in British radio
 1971 in the United Kingdom
 List of British films of 1971

References